Thomas "Old Tom" Parr ( (reputedly) – 13 November 1635) was an Englishman who was said to have lived for 152 years. A portrait of Parr hangs at Shrewsbury Museum and Art Gallery, with an inscription which reads "Thomas Parr died at the age of 152 years 19 days [sic]" "The old very old man or Thomas Parr, son of John Parr of Winnington in the Parish of Alberbury who was born in the year 1483 in Rayne of King Edward IV being 152 years old in the year 1635." The portrait was once in the collection of the Leighton family of Loton Park, which is in Alberbury.

Biography

Early life 

He existed and even thrived on a diet of "subrancid cheese and milk in every form, coarse and hard bread and small drink, generally sour whey," as the physician William Harvey wrote. "On this sorry fare, but living in his home, free from care, did this poor man attain to such length of days." He married Jane Taylor at the claimed age of 80 and had two children, both of whom died in infancy.

Later life 
Tom Parr purportedly had an affair when he was more than 100 years old, and fathered a child born out of wedlock, for which he had to do public penance in the church porch. After the death of his first wife at the alleged age of 110, he married Jane Lloyd, a widow, at the alleged age of 122. They lived together for twelve years, with Jane commenting that he never showed any signs of age or infirmity. As news of his reported age spread, 'Old Parr' became a national celebrity and was painted by Rubens and Van Dyck.

Death 
In 1635, Thomas Howard, 21st Earl of Arundel, visited Parr and took him to London to meet King Charles I, presented as a "curious piece of nature". The Earl arranged for Parr's daughter-in-law to accompany him on the southward trip, as well as an entertainer known as Jack the Fool, to amuse Parr on the journey. The carriage and escort attracted large crowds as it travelled towards London, with people stifling the old man in an attempt to touch him and hear him speak. By the time he finally arrived in the capital, Parr was reportedly blind and feeble. King Charles I was reported to have asked Parr: "Master Parr, you have lived longer than other men. What have you done more than other men?" He replied that he had performed penance for an affair with Catherine Milton, a village maiden. The King was stern, stating: "Fie, fie old man. Can you remember nothing but your vices?"

Parr was treated as a spectacle in London, but the food and environment caused him to die within only a few weeks, on 13 November 1635. The inscription of his gravestone reads:

Doubts of his age

William Harvey (1578–1657), the physician who discovered the circulation of the blood, performed an autopsy on Parr's body. The results were published in the book De ortu et natura sanguinis by John Betts as an attachment. Harvey examined Parr's body and found all his internal organs to be in a perfect state. No apparent cause of death could be determined, and it was assumed that Parr had simply died of overexposure because he had been too well fed. A modern interpretation of the results of the autopsy suggests that Parr was probably less than 70 years of age.

It is possible that Parr's birth records were confused with those of his grandfather. Parr did not claim to be able to remember specific events from the 15th century.

Cultural references

John Taylor wrote about Parr in his 1635 poem The Old, Old, Very Old Man, or the Age and Long Life of Thomas Parr, drawing the moral that longevity comes from a simple country lifestyle.
A portrait of Parr hangs in the National Portrait Gallery, London.
Parr is mentioned in two books by Charles Dickens, The Old Curiosity Shop and Dombey and Son.
Parr's old age is mentioned in the 1854 book Walden by Henry David Thoreau.
In 1871, Mark Twain considered writing An Autobiography of Old Parr where he would debunk the longevity claim.
In Bram Stoker's 1897 novel Dracula Abraham Van Helsing cites Parr's age as an example of "inexplicable" phenomena that are nevertheless real.
A Scotch whisky brand, Grand Old Parr, launched 1909, is named after Parr.
Parr is mentioned at the beginning of James Joyce's 1939 novel Finnegans Wake.
Parr has been used as an example of the supposed health benefits of some natural medicines, including herbal colon cleansing.
Edith Sitwell mentions Parr in 1958's English Eccentrics: A Gallery Of Weird And Wonderful Men And Women.
Parr is named in the 1973 novel Time Enough for Love by Robert A. Heinlein.
In the 1979 film The Champ, a small statue of Parr instigates a conversation between a boy and his stepfather.
Parr is mentioned in Robert Graves's poem A Country Mansion.
In Patrick O'Brian's 1980 book The Surgeon's Mate, lead character Stephen Maturin uses Parr as an example to encourage an aged friend contemplating marriage.
Margaret George's novel Elizabeth I imagines a meeting between Parr and the Queen.

Notes

References

External links

1635 deaths
Burials at Westminster Abbey
English centenarians
Longevity myths
Men centenarians
People from Shropshire
15th-century English people
16th-century English people
17th-century English people